John Mill may refer to:

 John Mill (died 1555) (1470s–1551), MP for Southampton
 John Mill (by 1533 – 1562 or later), MP for Melcombe Regis
 Sir John Mill, 1st Baronet (1587–1648), English politician 
 John Mill (theologian) (1645–1707), English theologian
 John Mill (Bundist) (1870–1952), political leader and activist
 John Stuart Mill (1806–1873), British philosopher and economist

See also
Sir John Barker-Mill, 1st Baronet (1803–1860), English cricketer
John Mille, MP
John Mills (disambiguation)